Amelanchier alnifolia, the saskatoon berry, Pacific serviceberry, western serviceberry, western shadbush,  or western juneberry, is a shrub with an edible berry-like fruit, native to North America.

Description
Its growth form spans from suckering and forming colonies to clumped.

As with all species in the genus Amelanchier, the flowers are white, with five quite separate petals and five sepals.

The fruit is a small purple pome  in diameter, ripening in early summer in the coastal areas and late summer further inland. Resembling blueberries, it has a waxy bloom. Serviceberries are relatively difficult to identify.

Chemistry
Also similar in composition to blueberries, saskatoons have total polyphenol content of 452 milligrams per 100 grams (average of 'Smoky' and 'Northline' cultivars), flavonols (61 mg) and anthocyanins (178 mg), although others have found the phenolic values to be either lower in the 'Smoky' cultivar or higher. Quercetin, cyanidin, delphinidin, pelargonidin, petunidin, peonidin, and malvidin were present in saskatoon berries.

Taxonomy

Varieties 
The three varieties are:
A. a. var. alnifolia. Northeastern part of the species' range.
A. a. var. pumila (Nutt.) A.Nelson. Rocky Mountains, Sierra Nevada.
A. a. var. semiintegrifolia (Hook.) C.L.Hitchc. Pacific coastal regions, Alaska to northwestern California.

Etymology 
The name saskatoon derives from the Cree inanimate noun   ('saskatoonberry',   'saskatoonberries').

The species name alnifolia is a feminine adjective. It is a compound of the Latin word for "alder", and the word for "leaf", .

Historically, it was also called pigeon berry.

Distribution and habitat

The plant can be found from Alaska across most of western Canada and in the western and north-central United States. It is a common shrub in the forest understory, as well as canyons.

Ecology

A. alnifolia is susceptible to cedar-apple rust, entomosporium leaf spot, fireblight, brown rot, cytospora canker, powdery mildew, and blackleaf. Problem insects include aphids, thrips, mites, bud moths, saskatoon sawflies, and pear slug sawflies. It is also a larval host to the pale tiger swallowtail, two-tailed swallowtail, and the western tiger swallowtail.

The foliage is browsed by deer, elk, rabbits, and livestock. The fruit are eaten by wildlife including birds, squirrels, and bears.

Cultivation

An individual bush may bear fruit 30 or more years.

Saskatoons are adaptable to most soil types with exception of poorly drained or heavy clay soils lacking organic matter. Shallow soils should be avoided, especially if the water table is high or erratic. Winter hardiness is exceptional, but frost can damage blooms as late as May. Large amounts of sunshine are needed for fruit ripening.

Uses

With a sweet, nutty taste, the fruits have long been eaten by Indigenous peoples in Canada, fresh or dried. They are well known as an ingredient in pemmican, a preparation of dried meat to which saskatoon berries are added as flavour and preservative. They are used in saskatoon berry pie, jam, wines, cider, beers, and sugar-infused berries similar to dried cranberries used for cereals, trail mix, and snack foods.

In 2004, the British Food Standards Agency suspended saskatoon berries from retail sales pending safety testing; the ban eventually was lifted after pressure from the European Union.

Nutrition

Saskatoon berries contain significant amounts of total dietary fiber, riboflavin and biotin, and the dietary minerals, iron and manganese, a nutrient profile similar to the content of blueberries.

Culture
The city of Saskatoon, Saskatchewan, is named after the berry.

References

External links
 
 

alnifolia
Flora of Subarctic America
Indigenous cuisine in Canada
Plants used in Native American cuisine
Trees of the United States
Flora of Western Canada
Flora of Ontario
Flora of the Northwestern United States
Flora of the Southwestern United States
Flora of the North-Central United States
Flora of the South-Central United States